Schrott is a surname. Notable people with the surname include:

Andreas Schrott (born 1981), Austrian footballer and manager
Beate Schrott (born 1988), Austrian hurdler
Erwin Schrott (born 1972), Uruguayan opera singer
Karl Schrott (born 1953), Austrian luger
Raoul Schrott, Austrian poet
Tyler Schrott, Ellicott city, citizen